In Greek mythology, Bergion (Ancient Greek: Βεργίων) or Beergios was a son of Poseidon and brother of Alebion. The two brothers engaged into battle with Heracles at Liguria of North-Western Italy. This version was mentioned in Aeschylus' play Promētheus Lyomenos, now lost. In some sources, he was  named as Ligys or Dercynus (Δέρκυνος).

Mythology 
Having obtained the Cattle of Geryon as his tenth labour, Heracles was passing through Liguria, on his way back to Mycenae from Iberia. Bergion and Albion were supported by a numerous army. The battle that followed was fierce. Hercules and his army were in a difficult position so he prayed to his father Zeus for help. With the aegis of Zeus, Heracles won the battle and both brothers were killed. It was this kneeling position of Heracles when prayed to his father Zeus that gave the name Engonasin ("Εγγόνασιν", derived from "εν γόνασιν"), meaning "on his knees" or "the Kneeler" to Hercules' constellation. The story is also alluded to in Hyginus and Dionysius.

Notes

References 

 Apollodorus, The Library with an English Translation by Sir James George Frazer, F.B.A., F.R.S. in 2 Volumes, Cambridge, MA, Harvard University Press; London, William Heinemann Ltd. 1921. ISBN 0-674-99135-4. Online version at the Perseus Digital Library. Greek text available from the same website.
 Dionysus of Halicarnassus, Roman Antiquities. English translation by Earnest Cary in the Loeb Classical Library, 7 volumes. Harvard University Press, 1937-1950. Online version at Bill Thayer's Web Site
 Dionysius of Halicarnassus, Antiquitatum Romanarum quae supersunt, Vol I-IV. . Karl Jacoby. In Aedibus B.G. Teubneri. Leipzig. 1885. Greek text available at the Perseus Digital Library.
 Gaius Julius Hyginus, Astronomica from The Myths of Hyginus translated and edited by Mary Grant. University of Kansas Publications in Humanistic Studies. Online version at the Topos Text Project.
John Tzetzes, Book of Histories, Book II-IV translated by Gary Berkowitz from the original Greek of T. Kiessling's edition of 1826. Online version at theio.com

Further reading 
Dictionary of Greek and Roman Biography and Mythology, page 994
Albion and Bergion at Perseus Digital Library

Demigods in classical mythology
Children of Poseidon